Parliamentary elections were held in Finland on 6 and 7 July 1958. The communist Finnish People's Democratic League emerged as the largest party, but was unable to form a government.

Background
Between March 1956, when Urho Kekkonen (Agrarian League) became President, and the 1958 elections, Finland had had four governments; Karl-August Fagerholm's Social Democratic Party majority government, V. J. Sukselainen's Agrarian minority government, and two civil-service caretaker governments, led by the Governor of the Bank of Finland, Rainer von Fieandt and the Chief Justice of Finland's Supreme Administrative Court, Reino Kuuskoski. The Social Democrats and Agrarians found it difficult to work together in the government, which significantly reduced Finland's chances of having a stable government, because the two other large or fairly large parties, the Finnish People's Democratic League and National Coalition Party, were excluded from the government.

The Social Democrats had been split into two parties since Väinö Tanner, a veteran Social Democrat and a former political prisoner (one of the eight "war culprits" after World War II), had very narrowly been elected the Social Democratic leader over Fagerholm in July 1957. The Social Democrats were among Kekkonen's chief opponents and wanted to defeat him in the 1962 presidential elections. After becoming President, Kekkonen wanted to defeat the Social Democrats politically, and thus their split into the majority and the minority, the so-called Skogists (after former Defence Minister Emil Skog) helped him move closer towards that goal.

In addition, Finland was suffering from a recession and, by that time's standards, a high unemployment rate, which helped the Finnish People's Democratic League to increase their support.  After these elections, Fagerholm formed his third government, which included the Social Democrats, Agrarians, National Coalitioners, Swedish People's Party and the People's Party of Finland, in August 1958.  Already when he appointed Fagerholm's government, President Kekkonen indicated that he would not help if it encountered problems.  Soon the government ran into difficulties:  the Soviet Union interrupted its trade negotiations with Finland, and in November or December 1958, the Soviet ambassador to Finland returned to the Soviet Union.  These "night frosts," along with President Kekkonen's and the other Agrarians' opposition (Foreign Minister Virolainen resigned from the government at the beginning of December 1958, and former Assistant Finance Minister Karjalainen wrote that it was time for the wise people to leave the government), caused Fagerholm to tender his resignation in December 1958. Sukselainen formed another centrist minority government in January 1959, while Kekkonen visited the Soviet Union where the Soviet leader Khrushchev assured him that all was again well in the Finnish-Soviet relations.

Results

References

General elections in Finland
Finland
Parliamentary
Finland
Election and referendum articles with incomplete results